Mason Lowell Hill (January 17, 1904March 11, 1992) was an American geologist. He was known for his expertise on earthquakes, and played a leading role in the discovery of oil along the Swanson River, the first commercial oil discovery in Alaska.

Early life and education
Hill was born on January 17, 1904. He attended Pomona College, where he was influenced by professor A. O. Woodford, the founder of the college's geology department, and graduated in 1926.

Career
Hill became the chief geologist for the Richfield Oil Company.

Retirement and death
Hill retired in 1969. He subsequently became a professor. He died of a stroke in his hometown of Whittier, California, on March 11, 1992.

References

20th-century American geologists
American seismologists
Pomona College alumni
1904 births
1992 deaths
American businesspeople in the oil industry